Derrick Hugh Michael Christie (born 15 March 1957) is an English former professional footballer who played as a winger. During his career, he made over 300 appearances in the Football League during spells with Northampton Town, Cambridge United, Reading, Cardiff City and Peterborough United.

Career
Christie began his career with Northampton Town, helping the club win promotion to the Third Division during the 1975–76 season. He joined Cambridge United in 1978 for £50,000, making over 100 appearances for the club, before moving on to Reading in 1984. However, he struggled to establish himself in the first team and joined Cardiff City the following year. Despite initially impressing, he was eventually released at the end of the 1985-86 season and finished his professional career with Peterborough United.

References

1957 births
Living people
English footballers
Northampton Town F.C. players
Cambridge United F.C. players
Reading F.C. players
Cardiff City F.C. players
Peterborough United F.C. players
English Football League players
Association football wingers